This is a list of mayors of San Borja District.

 1984-1989: Hugo Sánchez Solari, Christian People's Party (PPC).
 1990-1992: Hugo Sánchez Solari, Democratic Front (Fredemo)
 1993-1998: Luisa María Cuculiza Torre, Renewed Independent Front.
 1999: Luisa María Cuculiza Torre, Somos Perú.
 1999-2002: Jorge Lermo, Somos Perú.
 2003-2006: Alberto Tejada Noriega, Democracy with Values.
 2007-2010: Alberto Tejada Noriega, Values Peru .
 2011-2014: Marco Alvarez Vargas, Christian People's Party (PPC).
 2015-2018: Marco Alvarez Vargas, Christian People's Party (PPC).
 2019-2022: Alberto Tejada Noriega, Popular Action (Peru).

San Borja